The Seaplane Harbour (Estonian: Lennusadam) is a maritime museum in Tallinn, Estonia, opened in spring 2012. The museum is part of the Estonian Maritime Museum.

The museum is located in the Tallinn aeroplane harbour in a building originally constructed as a hangar for seaplanes in the area of Peter the Great's Naval Fortress. The hall has an area of 8000 m2. The hall was put out of service during the Soviet era. Its renovation started in 2010. The renovation was funded 70% by the European Regional Development Fund and 30% by the Estonian state.

The main attraction in the museum is the 1936 submarine Lembit, which was ordered by Estonia from the United Kingdom, and has nowadays been renovated to its original 1930s appearance. The museum also has a yellow submarine, which can be used to familiarise oneself with piloting a submarine, and a full-scale replica of a World War I era Short Type 184 seaplane. None of the original seaplanes remain to this day. The wreck of the wooden ship Maasilinn dates to the 16th century and had sailed between Saaremaa and mainland Estonia. The icebreaker Suur Tõll originally sailed for Finland under the name Wäinämöinen. It was conquered from the Russians near Helsinki in 1918 and donated to Estonia from Finland in 1922 according to the Treaty of Tartu.

There is also a special exhibit illustrating the background to the sinking of the MS Estonia ferry in 1994.

The attractions in the museum are located in three levels: in the air, on the sea and below the sea. The museum presents the history of the old maritime country Estonia in a modern visual language. The museum has submarine and flight simulators, and a pool where people can sail miniature ships and look at aquatic animals.

Gallery

See also
 Põhjala Brewery - also located in Noblessner Harbour
 List of museum ships

References

External links

 Official site
 Tallinnaan uusi merimuseo toukokuussa, yle.fi 28 November 2011, YLE. Accessed on 3 January 2012.
 Tallinn Seaplane Harbour - Lennusadam at Vimeo

Museums in Tallinn
Defunct airports in Estonia
Ports and harbours of Estonia